The following is a timeline of the history of the city of Holguín, Cuba.

Prior to 20th century

 1720
 Settlement established (approximate date).
 Plaza de Armas (square) laid out.
 1751 - Holguin becomes a city.
 1752 - Jurisdicción de Holguín established.
 1760 - Hospital de San Juan de Dios built.
 1809 - San Jose Church built. 
 1820 - San Isidore Church built.
 1868
 October 30: City taken by rebel mambises at start of the Ten Years' War.
 December 6: Spanish in power again.
 1872 - December 19: City taken by Cuban forces.
 1893 - Railway begins operating between port of Gibara and Holguin.
 1895 - El Eco de Holguin newspaper begins publication.
 1899 - Population: 6,054 city; 34,506 district; 327,715 province.

20th century

 1907 - Population: 7,592 city; 50,224 municipality; 455,086 province.
 1916 - Statue of Calixto García erected in Parque Calixto Garcia.
 1962 - Ahora newspaper begins publication.
 1966 - Population: 91,000.
 1970 - Population: 131,656.
 1976 - Centro Universitario de Holguin and Instituto Superior Pedagogico de Holguin established.
 1979 - Roman Catholic Diocese of Holguín established.
 1986 - Ediciones Holguín (publisher) established.
 1988 - El Chorro de Maita archaeological site excavated in Holguin Province.
 1999 - Population: 259,300 city; 1,029,700 province.

21st century

 2003 - Drought.
 2004 - Construction of Parque de Los Tiempos (park) begins.
 2014 - Population: 291,560.
 2015 - September: Catholic pope visits Holguin.

See also
 Holguin history (in Spanish)
 Timelines of other cities in Cuba: Camagüey, Cienfuegos, Guantánamo, Havana, Matanzas, Santiago de Cuba

References

This article incorporates information from the Spanish Wikipedia.

Bibliography

in English
 
in Spanish
 
 
 
 
 
  (chronology)
  (fulltext)

External links

 

Holguín
Holguin
Cuba-related lists
Holguin
Years in Cuba